FANUC ( or ; often styled Fanuc) is a Japanese group of companies that provide automation products and services such as robotics and computer numerical control wireless systems. These companies are principally  of Japan, Fanuc America Corporation of Rochester Hills, Michigan, USA, and FANUC Europe Corporation S.A. of Luxembourg.

FANUC is the largest maker of industrial robots in the world. FANUC had its beginnings as part of Fujitsu developing early numerical control (NC) and servo systems. FANUC is acronym for Fuji Automatic NUmerical Control.

History 
In 1955, Fujitsu Ltd. approached Seiuemon Inaba (:ja:稲葉清右衛門), who was then a young engineer, to lead a new subsidiary purposed to make the field of numerical control. This nascent form of automation involved sending instructions encoded into punched cards or magnetic tape to motors that controlled the movement of tools, effectively creating programmable versions of the lathes, presses, and milling machines. Within three years after spending heavily in R&D, he and his team of 500 employees shipped Fujitsu's first numerical-control machine to Makino Milling Machine Co. In 1972, the Computing Control Division became independent and FANUC Ltd. was established. The next phase of expansion would be computer numerical control, which relied on G-code,a standard programming language. At the time, the 10 largest CNC companies in the world were based in the U.S., however by 1982, FANUC had captured half of the world CNC market.

FANUC is listed on the first section of Tokyo Stock Exchange and is a constituent of the TOPIX 100 and Nikkei 225 stock market indices. It is headquartered in Yamanashi Prefecture.

In 1982, FANUC entered into a joint venture with General Motors Corporation (GM), called GMFanuc Robotics Corporation, to produce and market robots in the United States. The new company was 50 percent owned by each partner and was based in Detroit, with GM providing most of the management and FANUC the products. In 1987, FANUC entered into a joint venture with General Electric Company (GE). The two companies formed GE FANUC Automation to manufacture computerized numerical control (CNC) devices. GE stopped making its own CNC equipment and turned its Charlottesville, Virginia, plant over to the new company which produces FANUC CNC devices. FANUC adopted the German engineering slogan Weniger Teile, which means "fewer parts;" machines with fewer parts are cheaper to produce and easier for automatons to assemble, resulting in higher reliability and lower manufacturing costs.

The company's clients include numerous U.S. and Japanese automobile and electronics manufacturers. Use of industrial robots has allowed companies like Panasonic in Amagasaki to run factories which produce 2 million television sets a month (mostly high-end plasma LCD screens) with just 25 people.

FANUC has over 240 joint ventures subsidiaries, and offices in over 46 countries. It is the largest maker of CNC controls by market share with 65% of the global market. and is the leading global manufacturer of factory automation systems.

Subsidiaries and joint ventures

FANUC Europe Corporation S.A., a sister company, is headquartered in Luxembourg, with customers in Europe, and which provides sales, service and support in Europe and abroad.

FANUC America Corporation is responsible for FANUC operations in North and South America. The current incarnation, organized in 2013, unifies FANUC activities in the Americas, including the former FANUC Robotics America Corporation (1992-2013) and FANUC CNC America (2010-2013), which succeeded an earlier incarnation of FANUC America Corporation.

FANUC Robotics America Corporation (1992-2013)  supplied robotic automation in North and South America, with over 240,000 robots installed. It also produced software, controls, and vision products that aid in the development of robotic systems. Headquartered in Rochester Hills, Michigan, the company had 10 regional locations in the U.S., Canada, Mexico, and Brazil. The company provided these systems for applications including automotive and fabricated metals to medical devices and plastics. It was founded in 1982 as a joint venture between FANUC Ltd and General Motors Corporation, named GMFanuc Robotics Corporation. A staff of 70 began work at the GM Technical Center in Warren, Michigan. In 1992, the company became a wholly owned subsidiary of FANUC Ltd of Oshino-mura, Japan. The company was a member of the Robotics Industries Association (RIA) and of the International Federation of Robotics (IFR).

In 2010, FANUC America Corporation and the prior CNC business unit from GE Fanuc Intelligent Platforms in the US were combined into a new company by the name of FANUC CNC America. This business unit was a wholly owned subsidiary of FANUC Ltd. of Japan and offered CNC systems, lasers, Manufacturing Intelligence software products, field repairs and advanced technical services, expanded training classes, a vast inventory of CNC replacement parts, PCB motor repair and return, field support, and CS-24 after hours support. It was headquartered in the Chicago suburb of Hoffman Estates, Illinois. It offered CNC and laser technical services, training, replacement parts, PCB and motor repair and return, field support, and after hours support. It had over 30 locations in the U.S., Canada, Mexico, Brazil, and Argentina.  The company provides these services to machine tool builders, machine tool dealers, and small mom and pop tool shops across a variety of industries.  In 1977, the company was established as a wholly owned subsidiary of FANUC Ltd of Oshino-mura, Japan.

GE Fanuc Intelligent Platforms (1986-2010) was a joint venture between General Electric and FANUC Ltd.  In 2009, GE and FANUC Ltd. agreed to split, with FANUC Ltd. retaining the CNC business.  GE renamed its part of the business GE Intelligent Platforms.

FANUC India operations are led by Sonali Kulkarni.

FANUC NC controller

Control / device naming conventions 
Each generation of the FANUC numerical control system has different levels of device control capabilities, and these are generally referred to by a model or series number.

Each controller model is typically available with several device control capabilities, depending on what software functions are licensed for use on that device. Some common control capabilities are:
 M - Milling
 T - Turning (lathe)
 TT - Twin Turret
 P - Punch press
 G - Grinding

Within each model name, there can also be generational updates for each model, usually indicated by a trailing letter.

Model 0 is somewhat unusual in that both the number zero and the letter O are used interchangeably to indicate the model.

There is no specific syntax for distinguishing the model from the device type and series, with spaces or dashes or slashes, which can result in difficulty searching for information, parts, and service for this equipment. For example, in the FANUC-0 series, these are all valid identifications for various types of NC controls and machines:

NC controller capabilities 
When separate computer aided manufacturing software is used to control these different systems, the model differences can be used to tell the manufacturing software how to more efficiently use the system programming capabilities. Some FANUC NC controllers include:

See also

 Industrial robot
 Numerical control

References

External links

 FANUC Corporation 
 FANUC America Corporation
 FANUC Robotics Corporation
 FANUC Europe Corporation
 FANUC UK Ltd
 Hoover's Profile: FANUC CORPORATION
 FANUC's thumbnail overview of the history of FANUC CNC
 FANUC Introduces R-30iB Plus Robot Controller
 Finding FANUC powered CNC machine tools in the USA 

Multinational companies headquartered in Japan
Manufacturing companies of Japan
Robotics companies of Japan
Companies listed on the Tokyo Stock Exchange
Industrial robotics
Companies based in Yamanashi Prefecture
Technology companies established in 1972
Japanese companies established in 1972
Japanese brands
Furukawa Group
Numerical control
Oshino, Yamanashi